In Pakistan, more than 430 tree species are distributed over 82 families and 226 genera. Out of these, 22 species from 5 families and 11 genera belong to softwood trees of gymnosperms. For all plant families found in Pakistan, see Flora of Pakistan.

The Deodar Tree is the official national tree of Pakistan. Its name is driven from 'Sanskrit' which means "Wood of the God". It is one of the longest trees that has the heights of around 40-50 meters & trunk up to 3 meters in diameter.

Examples

See also
Ecoregions of Pakistan
Wildlife of Pakistan
Forestry in Pakistan
Midh Ranjha Tree

Further reading
"Acacia" in Flora of Pakistan. Published by Science Press (Beijing) and Missouri Botanical Garden Press.

References

External links
Pakistan Plant Database (PPD)
www.efloras.org - Flora of Pakistan
www.lahoregardening.com - Trees of Pakistan
www.hashtagnation.net - About Deodar Tree
PARC Databases by Pakistan Agricultural Research Council

 
Pakistan
trees